Silver Bells is a 2005 Hallmark Hall of Fame Christmas made-for-television drama film starring Anne Heche and Tate Donovan based on the 2004 novel of the same name by Luanne Rice. It originally aired on CBS on November 27, 2005.

Plot summary
Every year, widower Christy Byrne (Tate Donovan) has traveled from Nova Scotia with his children to sell their homegrown Christmas trees in New York City. His teenage son Danny (Michael Mitchell) is not into his father's business, but instead has a true passion for photography. One year in New York City, Danny and Christy get into an argument and Danny runs away, leaving Christy and his 10-year-old daughter Bridget (Courtney Jines) to return home without him. The next year, the two return to New York City to sell the trees while Christy goes out every night looking for Danny.

Catherine (Anne Heche) lives in the same New York neighborhood and hasn't celebrated Christmas since the year her husband died. Every year Christy has tried to sell her a tree, but Catherine politely refuses.  Neither of them realize that their lives are connected by Danny. While Christy is back in Nova Scotia with Bridget, Catherine pays Danny for photographs that he takes and puts them in the newspaper. When Christy comes back the following year, Catherine does not tell him that she knows where Danny is because Danny made her promise not to. Catherine does tell Christy afterwards when Danny injures himself by falling off the roof of the Belvedere Castle and into a frozen pond. In the hospital, Christy tells Danny that he is allowing him to stay in New York City to become a photographer.

Cast
 Anne Heche as Catherine O'Mara
 Tate Donovan as Christy Byrne
 Courtney Jines as Bridget Byrne
Michael Mitchell as Danny Byrne
 John Benjamin Hickey as Lawrence
 Lourdes Benedicto as Lizzie
 Victoria Justice as Rose

See also
 List of Christmas films

External links

"Silver Bells" at Hallmark Movie Channel 

2005 television films
2005 films
2000s Christmas drama films
American Christmas drama films
Christmas television films
Hallmark Hall of Fame episodes
CBS network films
Films directed by Dick Lowry
Films based on American novels
Television shows based on American novels
2000s English-language films
2000s American films